Glen Trosch (born August 4, 1963) is an American businessman considered an expert in the field of popular culture collectibles and memorabilia.  His primary areas of expertise are toys of the 1960s and 1970s, underground comix and vintage rock concert posters. Trosch is the owner of  Psychedelic Art Exchange, the world's leading dealer in museum quality vintage 1960s concert posters.

Background
Trosch started collecting comics in 1975. Following his graduation from college, (1985) Trosch worked for his family's business, The Maryland News Distributing Company. Trosh served as merchandising manager and oversaw the company's multimillion-dollar comic book program for 14 years.

Connected Music
In November 2003, Trosch bought Connected Music, an online music memorabilia company specializing in concert posters, promotional items, T-shirts, autographs, photographs, recordings, stage props and other rock and roll ephemera. Trosch sold Connected Music in December 2006.

Psychedelic art exchange
In 2007 Trosch and business partner Scott Tilson, founded Psychedelic Art Exchange, an online auction site and that deals with vintage rock concert posters. Psychedelic Art Exchange was founded to meet the burgeoning demand for more sophisticated information regarding the grading, authenticating and pricing of vintage 1960s rock concert posters. A retail gallery was opened in Baltimore, Maryland, January, 2012.

Education
Trosch  graduated from Towson University in 1986 with a degree in psychology.

References

1963 births
Living people
People from Maryland
Underground comix